Víctor Domingo Silva Endeiza (May 12, 1882, Tongoy, Elqui Province – August 20, 1960, Santiago) was a Chilean poet, journalist, playwright and  writer. He was of Basque descent by mother's side.

Silva was born into an educated family who instilled in him a love of literature. In 1906 he was elected diputado (deputy) (a member of the lower house of Chile's bicameral Congress) of the provinces of Copiapó, Freirina and Chañaral. During his tenure as Deputy, Silva began publishing poetry in El Mercurio, a well-known newspaper centered in the Valparaiso region.

He was dubbed "el poeta nacional" ("the national poet") since he dedicated a good portion of his poetry to national topics, including his celebrated poem, La Bandera ("The Flag"), in which he exalts his patriotism. Silva entered the diplomatic corps in 1928 and was posted to Patagonia in Argentina, where he was a driving force behind the establishment of the province of Aisén. Later he was made general consul of Chile and was posted to Madrid where he remained for a number of years, finally returning to Chile in 1948. In 1954 Chile's national award for literature was bestowed upon him.

Selected poems
 Adolescencia (1906)
 Golondrina de invierno (1912)
 Palomilla brava (1923)
 El alma de Chile (1928), antología poética
 El mestizo Alejo (1934)
 Poemas de Ultramar (1935)
 El cachorro (1937)
 La Criollita

Selected plays
 El Rey de la Araucanía (1936)
 Aún no se ha puesto el sol (1950)
 La tempestad se avecina
 El hombre de la casa

References

1882 births
1960 deaths
People from Elqui Province
Chilean male poets
Chilean diplomats
Chilean people of Basque descent
National Prize for Literature (Chile) winners
20th-century Chilean poets
20th-century Chilean male writers